Pär Edblom (born January 31, 1985) is a Swedish former ice hockey player.

Edblom made his Swedish Hockey League debut playing with Leksands IF during the 2013–14 SHL season. In September 2016, Edblom got a stick in the eye during a HockeyAllsvenskan game against AIK, which forced him into seven surgeries and subsequently to finish his career.

References

External links

1985 births
Living people
Leksands IF players
Örebro HK players
IF Björklöven players
Modo Hockey players
Södertälje SK players
IF Troja/Ljungby players
IK Oskarshamn players
Swedish ice hockey forwards
People from Örnsköldsvik Municipality
Sportspeople from Västernorrland County
21st-century Swedish people